Asciadium is a genus of flowering plants in the family Apiaceae. Its only species is Asciadium coronopifolium, native to Cuba.

References

Flora of Cuba
Monotypic Apiaceae genera
Apiaceae